Michael Kent may refer to:
 Michael Kent (computer specialist), co-founded the Computer Group which used a statistics-based system to predict college football results
 Michael Kent (comedian), American comedian and magician 
 Michael Kent (footballer), English footballer
 Prince Michael of Kent, member of the British royal family